Nasir Mirza (b. 1487–1515 d.) was the third son of Umar Sheikh Mirza and the younger half-brother of Babur, the founder of the Mughal Empire.

According to the Baburnama, Nasir Mirza was four years younger to Babur and his mother was a native of Andijan named Umid, she was a mistress of Umar Sheikh Mirza.

References

1487 births
1515 deaths
Timurid dynasty